Harold Clayton Lloyd Jr. (January 25, 1931 – June 9, 1971) was an American actor and singer.

Career
The third child and only son of the silent film comedian Harold Lloyd and actress Mildred Davis, Lloyd made several B-movies in the 1950s and 1960s, including The Flaming Urge (1953) (one of only two starring roles) and Frankenstein's Daughter (1958). In 1959, he had a role in the film Girls Town, which features the son of another famous silent movie comedian, Charles Chaplin Jr. He was given production roles in the compilations of his father's films, released in the early 1960s. As a singer, he performed in several films, had moderate successes in cabaret in Hollywood and elsewhere, and released an album of romantic ballads in 1965 titled Intimate Style.

Personal life
Lloyd (known as Dukey to his family) found it very difficult to live in the shadow of his very famous father, and was an alcoholic from his twenties onward. In addition, he struggled with his homosexuality at a time when it was considered socially unacceptable. Author Tom Dardis notes that Lloyd Sr. was understanding about his son's sexuality, all the more so given Lloyd Jr.'s tendency toward violent lovers. Consequently, the younger Lloyd often returned to Greenacres, the family estate, battered and bruised after his encounters. His father's tolerance had its limits, however, and (in not an uncommon attitude at the time) Lloyd Sr. blamed his own absences during his son's childhood for his sexuality. In 1953, he briefly was engaged to the Chilean actress Marina Cisternas. In 1960, he was again engaged, this time to Parisian socialite Irene Barrelet deRicou, daughter of French tennis player Paul Barrelet de Ricou and socialite Louise Barrelet de Ricou. Irene was warned by many, including Bing Crosby, not to marry Lloyd, but it wasn't until she caught him with another man that the wedding was canceled. He had a home in Palm Springs, California

Death
Lloyd suffered a massive stroke in 1965 from which he never fully recovered. He died on June 9, 1971, at age 40, three months after the death of his father.  He was interred with his parents in a crypt in the Great Mausoleum's Begonia Corridor at Glendale Forest Lawn Cemetery.

Filmography

References

External links
 
 Review of Frankenstein's Daughter
 The Flaming Urge online at The Internet Archive
 

1931 births
1971 deaths
American male film actors
American gay actors
Male actors from Beverly Hills, California
Musicians from Palm Springs, California
Musicians from Beverly Hills, California
Male actors from Palm Springs, California
20th-century American male actors
20th-century American musicians
Burials at Forest Lawn Memorial Park (Glendale)
LGBT people from California
20th-century American LGBT people